This is a list of high schools in New York City.

All boroughs

The Bronx

Brooklyn

Manhattan

Queens

Staten Island

See also
List of high schools in New York
List of school districts in New York

References

External links
NYC Department of Education: High School Directory by Borough
NYC Department of Education: List of High Schools: Bronx
NYC Department of Education: List of High Schools: Brooklyn
NYC Department of Education: List of High Schools: Manhattan
NYC Department of Education: List of High Schools: Queens
NYC Department of Education: List of High Schools: Staten Island

 
New York City
Highschools